Phthalylsulfathiazole (also known as sulfathalidine) belongs to the group of drugs called sulfonamides. The drug is a broad-spectrum antimicrobial that can treat different types of infections including intestinal. The mechanism of action depends on competitive antagonism with para-aminobenzoic acid and inhibition of dihydropteroate synthetase activity, which in turn leads to impaired synthesis of dihydrofolic acid and as a result its active metabolite necessary for the synthesis of purine and pyrimidine. 

The drug is indicated in the treatment of dysentery, colitis, gastroenteritis and intestinal surgery.  It is a derivative of sulfathiazole in which the phthalic acid substitution on the aniline nitrogen prevents it from being absorbed into the blood stream from the gut.  Adverse effects may include allergic reactions, vitamin B insufficiency, agranulocytosis, and aplastic anemia.

References

2-Thiazolyl compounds
Sulfonamide antibiotics